Jacques Bourgeois (1912 – 30 August 1996 in Paris) was a 20th-century French musicologist.

During the Second World War, Jacques Bourgeois participated in the Resistance as leader of the MNPGD - Northern Zone. In 1943, he worked with François Mitterrand's network, who suspected him of being a double agent for the Gestapo, along with his friend Albert Médina. He even considered liquidating them, but refrained from doing so for lack of evidence. In September 1944, after the Liberation of Paris, he was arrested and interrogated by Edgar Morin and Dionys Mascolo. He continued his career as a musicographer and music critic until his death in 1996. (Source: Mitterrand par Philip Short.)

He was one of the participants in the famous radio program  by Armand Panigel on France Musique, along with Antoine Goléa and Jean Roy in particular. He was also artistic director of the Chorégies d'Orange and producer of the radio program Jeunes Chanteurs de demain on France Musique.

Works 
1976: Richard Wagner, Paris, Éditions D'aujourd'hui 
1978: Giuseppe Verdi, Paris, Éditions Julliard
1982: L'Opéra : des origines à demain, Julliard

References

External links 

20th-century French musicologists
French radio producers
1912 births
1996 deaths
Writers about music